Eve Jobs (born July 9, 1998) is an American fashion model. She is the daughter of the late Apple Inc. CEO and inventor Steve Jobs and businesswoman Laurene Powell Jobs.

Early life 
Jobs is the youngest daughter of Steve Jobs (his eldest being Lisa Brennan-Jobs from his first partner) and Laurene Powell Jobs, a Wharton Business School graduate. She also has two older siblings: a brother named Reed, and a sister Erin. She is of Syrian ancestry through her father, who had been adopted by an American couple (although her biological paternal grandmother was an American woman of Swiss and German descent from Wisconsin).  After he died in 2011, her mother became one of the richest women in the world. Her paternal aunt, Mona Simpson, is a novelist and English professor. She was named after Eve from the book of Genesis.

Jobs attended Upper Echelon Academy in Wellington, Florida, and was an accomplished equestrian; she was ranked as the fifth best out of 1000 for riders under age of 25. She graduated from Stanford University in 2021, after which she moved to New York.

Career 
In March 2022, Jobs signed with DNA Model Management. Prior to having signed to the agency, Jobs made her runway debut with the French fashion label Coperni, and appeared in a Glossier holiday campaign with actress Sydney Sweeney. She has also appeared in a solo Vogue editorial and on the October 2022 cover of Vogue Japan. In fall 2022, she starred in a solo Louis Vuitton campaign.

Notes

References 

Living people
1998 births
American female models
Family of Steve Jobs
Stanford University alumni
American female equestrians
American people of Syrian descent
American people of German descent
American people of Swiss descent
People from Palo Alto, California